The Venerable  William Philip Hurrell  (27 January 1860 – 15 July 1952) was an Anglican priest in the late nineteenth  Vicar of Dallington and early 20th centuries.

Hurrell was educated at Charterhouse  and Oriel College, Oxford and ordained in 1884.  He held curacies at Fen Ditton, Elm and Peterborough. He was  Vicar of Northampton from 1892 to 1905, and of Hinckley from then until 1922. He was the third Archdeacon of Loughborough.

Notes

1860 births
People educated at Charterhouse School
Alumni of Oriel College, Oxford
Archdeacons of Loughborough
1952 deaths